Sobinsky District is an administrative and municipal district (raion), one of the sixteen in Vladimir Oblast, Russia. It is located in the center and the south of the oblast. Its administrative center is the town of Sobinka. Population:   24,864 (2002 Census);  The population of Sobinka accounts for 34.3% of the district's total population.

References

Notes

Sources 

Districts of Vladimir Oblast